Erika Yaneth Valek (born April 9, 1982) is a former college basketball player for the Purdue Boilermakers.

High school
Born in Bucaramanga, Colombia to Janeth and Juan Carlos Valek, she played for Lubbock Coronado High School in Lubbock, Texas, where she was named a WBCA All-American. She participated in the 2000 WBCA High School All-America Game where she scored six points.

College

Valek, a point guard, won the Frances Pomeroy Naismith Award as the best women's college basketball player under 5'8" in 2004.  She was also named to the 2003 All-Big Ten team and the 2003 NCAA East Regional all-tournament team.

Purdue statistics
Source

Professional

She was drafted in the 2004 WNBA Draft by the Detroit Shock and was traded with college teammate Shereka Wright and Sheila Lambert for Chandi Jones in a draft day deal to the Phoenix Mercury.  Valek, however, was cut by the Mercury before the regular season and did not play for the team.

Notes

External links
Purdue profile

1982 births
Living people
Colombian women's basketball players
Coronado High School (Lubbock, Texas) alumni
People from Bucaramanga
Point guards
Purdue Boilermakers women's basketball players
Central American and Caribbean Games bronze medalists for Colombia
Competitors at the 2006 Central American and Caribbean Games
Central American and Caribbean Games medalists in basketball
Sportspeople from Santander Department